Reynold Vincent "Rene" Anselmo (January 14, 1926September 20, 1995) was an American businessman who founded the satellite company PanAmSat and co-founded the television network Univision.

Early life
Anselmo was born in Bedford, Massachusetts. His father was of Italian descent and the postmaster in Quincy, Massachusetts. At the age of 16, he enlisted in the United States Marine Corps and flew 37 missions as a tail gunner on a dive bomber in the Pacific Theatre of Operations during World War II.
He graduated from the University of Chicago in 1951.

Career 
Anselmo travelled to Mexico, where he was hired by Televisa to produce television shows for Mexican television. He wed his wife Mary during his residence in Mexico. Anselmo returned to the United States in 1963 to help run the Spanish International Network Spanish language television network (the current day Univision). In 1984, he co-founded PanAmSat. PanAmSat gained a foothold in the television market by providing satellite services for private commercial communication networks, such as those used by international conglomerates to connect far flung manufacturing operations around the globe or provide data connections between a large number of retail outlets and corporate headquarters.

Personal life 
Anselmo was married to Mary Anselmo, with whom he had three children, daughter Pier and sons, Rayce and Reverge.

Anselmo was described as having "unflinching self-confidence and willingness to risk all in his fight to upend the status quo" in a tribute by SpaceNews. He challenged the monopoly in satellite provision held by Intelsat in the 1980s, taking out full-page ads in the Wall Street Journal asking political leaders, including former U.S. President Ronald Reagan, to open up the satellite telecommunications market. He donated over 100,000 daffodils and tulips to the city of Greenwich, Connecticut.

Anselmo died September 20, 1995, from heart disease, aged 69. PanAmSat was left to his wife and his son-in-law, Fred Landman.

Reverge Anselmo 
Anselmo's son Reverge owned Anselmo Vineyards before selling it in 2014, after a publicized battle with Shasta County, California.

As of 2020, Reverge Anselmo, who lives in Connecticut, contributed more than $100,000 to Patrick Jones' Shasta County District 4 Supervisor successful election campaign, "believed to be, at that time, the largest individual dollar contribution ever, to a local political campaign". In 2020, the Shasta County District Supervisor salary was $54,948 or $53,508. In addition, he has contributed more than a half-million dollars to Shasta County political committees, including $400,000 in November to Shasta General Purpose Committee/Recall Shasta, a group for the recall of three supervisors, after giving them $50,000 in August.

References

External links 
 

1995 deaths
1926 births
20th-century American businesspeople
American television executives
United States Marine Corps personnel of World War II
United States Marines
Businesspeople from Boston
American people of Italian descent
American expatriates in Mexico
University of Chicago alumni
Child soldiers in World War II
Univision people